Pelé Eterno (in English: Pele Forever) is a 2004 Brazilian documentary film directed by Anibal Massaini Neto. It traces the life and career of the Brazilian soccer star Pelé, one of the greatest footballers of all time, from his poor childhood growing up in a little city, up to the present.

The film includes Pelé's greatest achievements, titles, interesting facts about his life, never before seen footage, and testimonials from personalities like Zito, Pepe, Mário Zagallo, Tostão, Rivellino, Carlos Alberto Torres, and several others.

References

External links

2004 films
Brazilian documentary films
Brazilian association football films
Documentary films about sportspeople
Documentary films about association football
Cultural depictions of Pelé